Write-only or write only may refer to:

A file access permission type
In programming languages, a property of a class, which has only mutator methods
 Write-only language, a derogatory term for programming languages that are hard to read
 Write-only publishing, a derogatory term for predatory open-access publishing
 Write-only memory (disambiguation)